Within is the second studio album by the Swedish melodic black metal band Embraced released in 2000 on Regain Records.

Track listing

Personnel
Kalle Johansson - vocals
Thomas Lejon - drums
Julius Chmielewski - keyboards
Sven Karlsson - keyboards, mastering
Michael Håkansson - bass
Davor Tepic - guitars
Peter Mårdklint - guitars, mastering

Additional personnel
Odious Engender - logo art
K. Metz - cover art, layout
Staffan Olsson - mastering
Tommy Tägtgren - engineering, mixing
Jenny Baumgartner - photography

External links
Within at Allmusic

2000 albums
Embraced albums
Black metal albums by Swedish artists
Regain Records albums